The 1950 college football season finished with the unbeaten and untied Oklahoma Sooners (9–0) being the consensus choice for national champion.  On New Year's Day, however, the  Sooners were upset by the Kentucky Wildcats (ranked No. 7 in the AP and UP polls) in the Sugar Bowl.  The Army Cadets, ranked No. 2 in the AP Poll, had been defeated in their final regular season game by 2–6 Navy, 14–2.  However, the final poll had been issued on November 27, and the bowl games had no effect on Oklahoma's status as the No. 1 team.

During the 20th century, the NCAA had no playoff for the college football teams that would later be described as "Division I-A".  While the NCAA has never officially endorsed a championship team, it has documented the choices of some selectors in its official NCAA Football Bowl Subdivision Records publication. The AP Poll in 1950 consisted of the votes of as many as 317 sportswriters.  Though not all writers voted in every poll, the sportswriters who did cast ballots voted on the ten best teams.  Under a point system of 10 points for first place, 9 for second, etc., the "overall" ranking was determined, and the top twenty colleges were ranked based on their overall points.

For the first time, the Associated Press issued a "preseason poll", before most teams played their first games.

Starting in 1950, the United Press began the "Coaches Poll." "Thirty-five of the nation's foremost football coaches will rate the country's top collegiate football teams each week for the United Press this coming season," an announcement stated, with "five coaches from each section of the country -- the east, midlands, midwest, Pacific coast, the Rockies, south and southwest".  The UP added, referring to the AP writers' poll, "The nature of the board giving each section of the country equal representation avoids the sectional bias and ballot box stuffing for which other football polls have been criticized." The coaches named Notre Dame as the No. 1 team in the first UP poll, with 25 of the 35 first place votes.

Generally, the top teams played on New Year's Day in the four major postseason bowl games: the Rose Bowl (near Los Angeles at Pasadena), the Sugar Bowl (New Orleans), the Orange Bowl (Miami), and the Cotton Bowl (Dallas).

Conference and program changes

Conference changes
One conference began play during 1950:
Oregon Collegiate Conference – a conference active through the 1965 season; also known as the Oregon Intercollegiate Conference

Membership changes

September
In the preseason AP poll released on September 25, 1950, the defending champion Fighting Irish of Notre Dame were the overwhelming choice for first, with 101 of 123 first place votes.  Far behind were No. 2 Army, No. 3 Michigan, No. 4 Tennessee and No. 5 Texas (which had won at Texas Tech 28–14).  As the regular season progressed, a new poll would be issued on the Monday following the weekend's games.

On September 30  
No. 1 Notre Dame beat No. 20 North Carolina 14–7.  No. 2 Army beat Colgate 28–0,  No. 3 Michigan lost to No. 19 Michigan State 14–7.  No. 4 Tennessee lost at Mississippi State, 7–0.  No. 5 Texas beat Purdue, 34–26, but fell to 7th.  No. 6 Oklahoma beat Boston College 28–0.  No. 10 SMU, which had already beaten Georgia Tech 33–13, defeated No. 11 Ohio State 32–27. The next AP Poll featured No. 1 Notre Dame, No. 2 Michigan State, No. 3 SMU, No. 4 Army, and No. 5 Oklahoma.

October
October 7 
No. 1 Notre Dame lost to Purdue, 28–14, and eventually finished with a 4–4–1 record.  No. 2 Michigan State lost to Maryland, 34–7.   No. 3 SMU won at Missouri 21–0.  No. 4 Army beat Penn State 41–7 and was elevated to the first spot in the next poll.  No. 5 Oklahoma beat Texas A&M 34–28.  No. 6 Kentucky registered a fourth shutout and a 4–0 record, with a 40–0 win against Dayton.  No. 7 Texas, which was idle, rose to 4th place behind Army, SMU, and Oklahoma and ahead of Kentucky.

October 14  
No. 1 Army beat No. 18 Michigan 27–6 at Yankee Stadium.  No. 2 SMU beat Oklahoma A&M 56–0.  No. 3 Oklahoma and No. 4 Texas met in Dallas, with Oklahoma winning narrowly, 14–13.  No. 5 Kentucky beat Cincinnati 41–7.   No. 7 California, which had beaten USC 13–7, rose to 5th in the next poll behind Army, Oklahoma, SMU, and Kentucky.

October 21 
All of the top five teams stayed undefeated with blowout victories. No. 1 Army won at Harvard 49–0.  No. 2 Oklahoma beat Kansas State 58–0. In Houston, No. 3 SMU beat No. 15 Rice 42–21.  In Philadelphia, No. 4 Kentucky beat Villanova 34–7.  No. 5 California beat Oregon State in Portland 27–0. With their victory over a ranked opponent, SMU jumped to No. 1 in the next poll, ahead of Army, Oklahoma, Kentucky, and California.
 
October 28  
No. 1 SMU was idle.  No. 2 Army won at Columbia 34–0.  No. 3 Oklahoma won at Iowa State 20–7.  In Atlanta, No. 4 Kentucky beat Georgia Tech 28–14.
No. 5 California beat St. Mary's 40–25, but still dropped in the next poll. They were replaced in the top five by No. 6 Ohio State, which had lost only to SMU and had just beaten Iowa 83–21; eventual Heisman winner Vic Janowicz accounted for six touchdowns and kicked eight extra points in the Iowa game. The Buckeyes were elevated to No. 4 behind SMU, Army, and Oklahoma and ahead of Kentucky.

November
November 4 No. 1 SMU lost at No. 7 Texas, 23–20.  No. 2 Army won at No. 15 Pennsylvania 28–13.  No. 3 Oklahoma won at Colorado 27–18.  No. 4 Ohio State won at Northwestern 32–0.  No. 5 Kentucky beat No. 17 Florida 40–6.  No. 7 Texas beat SMU 23–20, and returned to fifth place behind Army, Ohio State, Oklahoma, and Kentucky.

November 11  No. 1 Army beat New Mexico 51–0.  No. 2 Ohio State beat No. 15 Wisconsin 19–14.  No. 3 Oklahoma won at No. 19 Kansas, 33–13.  No. 4 Kentucky won at Mississippi State, 48–21.  No. 5 Texas beat Baylor 27–20.  No. 6 California, moved to 7–0–0 after a 35–0 win against No. 19 UCLA. The next AP Poll elevated Ohio State to No. 1 and Oklahoma to No. 2, with Army falling to 3rd even though they received the largest number of first-place votes. California moved up to No. 4, ahead of Kentucky and Texas.

November 18   No. 1 Ohio State lost at No. 8 Illinois, 14–7.  No. 2 Oklahoma beat Missouri 41–7.  No. 3 Army won at Stanford 7–0.  No. 4 California defeated San Francisco 13–7.  No. 5 Kentucky handed visiting North Dakota an 83–0 defeat to extend its record to 9–0–0, but still faced a final game against No. 9 Tennessee, whose only loss was by a single touchdown.  No. 6 Texas won at TCU 21–7. The next poll featured No. 1 Oklahoma, No. 2 Army, No. 3 Kentucky, No. 4 California, and No. 5 Texas.

November 25  No. 1 Oklahoma beat No. 16 Nebraska 49–35.  No. 2 Army was idle as it prepared for the Army–Navy Game.  No. 3 Kentucky lost at No. 9 Tennessee, 7–0.  No. 4 California and unranked Stanford played to a 7–7 tie in Berkeley.  No. 5 Texas beat Texas A&M 21–6. Michigan beat No. 8 Ohio State in the famous Snow Bowl 9–3 and earned a berth in the Rose Bowl against California. The final AP poll was released on November 27, although some colleges had not completed their schedules. Undefeated Oklahoma and Army were chosen as No. 1 and No. 2, with Texas (whose only loss was to Oklahoma by one point) at No. 3. Tennessee and California rounded out the top five, with undefeated Princeton at No. 6 and Kentucky moving down to No. 7 after their loss to Tennessee.

On December 2, with its champion status assured, No. 1 Oklahoma beat Oklahoma A&M 41–14.  No. 2 Army (9–0–0) was heavily favored to beat unranked, and 2–6–0, Navy.  Instead, the Philadelphia game turned into a 14–2 win for the Midshipmen.  No. 3 Texas played a game on December 9, beating LSU 21–6. The Coaches Poll, which waited until the end of the regular season to release its final rankings, kept Oklahoma at No. 1 but dropped Army to No. 5 behind Texas, Tennessee, and California.

Conference standings

Major conference standings

Independents

Minor conferences

Minor conference standings

Rankings

Bowl games

Heisman Trophy voting
The Heisman Trophy is given to the year's most outstanding player

Source:

See also
 1950 College Football All-America Team

References